is a railway station on the Takayama Main Line in the city of Kakamigahara, Gifu Prefecture, Japan, operated by Central Japan Railway Company (JR Central).

Lines

Station layout
Sohara Station has one ground-level side platform and one ground-level island platform connected by a footbridge. The station is unattended.

Platforms

Adjacent stations

History
Sohara Station opened on June 1, 1942. The station was absorbed into the JR Central network upon the privatization of Japanese National Railways (JNR) on April 1, 1987.

Surrounding area
Kawasaki Aerospace Company Gifu Factory

See also

 List of Railway Stations in Japan

Railway stations in Gifu Prefecture
Takayama Main Line
Railway stations in Japan opened in 1942
Stations of Central Japan Railway Company
Kakamigahara, Gifu